Saint-Pierre-d'Entremont may refer to the following places in France:

 Saint-Pierre-d'Entremont, Isère, a commune in the Isère department
 Saint-Pierre-d'Entremont, Orne, a commune in the Orne department
 Saint-Pierre-d'Entremont, Savoie, a commune in the Savoie department